The Círculo de Escritores Cinematográficos (Cinema Writers Circle) (CEC) is a private non-profit that brings together writers and film critics in Spain in order to create, support, and promote cultural activities related to the various facets of film. Every year, the organization holds an awards ceremony, commonly known as Premios CEC, to honour the highest achievements in Spanish film. It was founded in 1945 in Madrid by Fernando Viola, Luis Gómez Mesa, Carlos Fernández Cuenca, Joaquín Luis Romero Marchent, Pío García Viñolas, Francisco Hernández Blasco, Adriano del Valle, Pío Ballesteros, Fernando Merelo, José González de Ubieta, Domingo Fernández Barreira, Fernando Méndez Leite, Luis Figuerola, Antonio Barbero, and Antonio Crespo.

CEC's primary objective is the "protection and dissemination of film art". Notable members of the circle today include Alfonso Sánchez, José María García Escudero, Pascual Cebollada, Rafaela Rodríguez, José Luis Garci, Fernando Méndez Leite, and honorary members have included Ingmar Bergman, Federico Fellini, and Cantinflas.

Premios CEC

Since 1946, the organization has awarded the top achievers in film for the previous year, with the exception of 1988–1990, when the ceremony was suspended.

The 12 original award categories were:
 Best film
 Best director
 Best actor
 Best actress
 Best supporting actor
 Best supporting actress
 Best cinematography
 Best set design
 Best score
 Best story
 Best screenplay
 Critics' choice
 Best literary adaptation

References

External links
	
 Official website 
 

Organizations established in 1945
Film organisations in Spain
1945 establishments in Spain